Richville is an unincorporated community and census-designated places in southern Perry Township, Stark County, Ohio, United States.  State Route 627 passes through the community. The community is part of the Canton–Massillon Metropolitan Statistical Area.

Richville was laid out in 1836. A post office was established at Richville in 1872, and remained in operation until 1902.

In 1997, the former Richville Elementary School was sold to a local church, which later abandoned the property. Efforts to sell the property to recover unpaid back taxes were unsuccessful, in part because of the potential cost of asbestos remediation. The building was later demolished.

References

Unincorporated communities in Stark County, Ohio
Unincorporated communities in Ohio
Census-designated places in Stark County, Ohio